Harit may refer to:

Harit (name)
Harit Pradesh, a proposed new state of India 
Kasr El Harit, a town in Egypt